The 1973 Football Cup of Ukrainian SSR among KFK  was the annual season of Ukraine's football knockout competition for amateur football teams.

Competition schedule

First qualification round

|}
Notes:

Second qualification round

|}
Notes:

Quarterfinals (1/4)

|}

Semifinals (1/2)

|}
Replay

|}

Final
October 20

|}

See also
 1973 KFK competitions (Ukraine)

External links
 (1973 - 35 чемпионат СССР Кубок Украинской ССР среди КФК) at footbook.ru

Ukrainian Amateur Cup
Ukrainian Amateur Cup
Amateur Cup